Best of Uetoaya: Single Collection is the first greatest hits album by Japanese pop singer Aya Ueto. It was released on September 20, 2006 on Flight Master.

Background
Best of Uetoaya: Single Collection includes all of Ueto's previously released singles as well as one new song, "Shimokita Ijō Harajuku Miman", which is a cover of the Ueto-led TV drama Shimokita Sundays'''s theme song, originally performed by Fumiya Fujī. The album was released in three formats: "Collector's Edition" (limited to 10,000 copies), which comes with CD, DVD and an original wallet cord created in collaboration with Beams, "Premium Edition", which comes with CD and a DVD featuring a selection of ten music videos, and the CD-only "Standard Edition". The "Collector's Edition" sold out on the first day of release.

Chart performanceBest of Uetoaya: Single Collection'' peaked at #2 on the Oricon Daily Albums Chart and debuted at #5 on the Weekly Albums Chart with 28,213 copies sold, becoming Ueto's first Top 10 entry in over two years and a half. The "Collector's Edition" sold out on the first day of release. The album charted for a total of eight weeks and sold over 48,000 copies.

Track listing

Charts and sales

References

2006 greatest hits albums
Aya Ueto albums
Pony Canyon compilation albums